The 2022 FAI Women's Cup Final (known as The EVOKE.ie FAI Women's Cup Final for sponsorship reasons) was the final match of the 2022 FAI Women's Cup, the national association football Cup of the Republic of Ireland. The match took place on 6 November 2022 at Tallaght Stadium in Dublin. Shelbourne and Athlone Town contested the match.

The match was shown live on RTÉ2 and RTÉ2 HD in Ireland, and via the RTÉ Player worldwide with commentary from Ger Canning and Stephanie Roche. It was refereed by Seán Grant, assisted by Ciaran Delaney and Fintan Butler with Ray Matthews as Fourth Official. The 5,073 attendance was a record for a stand-alone women's final in Ireland. President Michael D. Higgins was the Guest of Honour.

Shelbourne beat first time finalists Athlone Town 2–0 to secure the trophy for the second time and avenge their defeat by Wexford Youths in the 2021 final. Crowned Women's National League champions the previous week, Shelbourne claimed a League and Cup "double".

Match

Summary
After six minutes, Shelbourne took the lead when Alex Kavanagh's left-wing free kick was not collected by Athlone's goalkeeper Niamh Coombes on her goal-line. Coombes was under heavy pressure from Jessie Stapleton, and protested she had been impeded after the ball deflected into the goal off Stapleton's back. Shelbourne scored again on 23 minutes when Megan Smyth-Lynch's inswinging corner kick saw Shauna Fox beat Coombes to head the ball back across goal, where it was headed in from close range by Fox's central defensive partner Pearl Slattery.

In the second half Athlone enjoyed more possession but were fortunate when Keeva Keenan's 49th-minute cross bounced off their crossbar. Scarlett Herron thought she had reduced the arrears on 70 minutes, but her header was disallowed for a marginal offside decision. In the 78th minute Madie Gibson, the American striker whose semi-final hat-trick had secured Athlone's place in the final, struck a clear chance wide of goal as Shelbourne held on.

Athlone manager Tommy Hewitt was unhappy with the decisions of the officials but "immensely proud" of his defeated players. Shelbourne's victorious captain Pearl Slattery was pleased to secure the double and to avenge the "unfinished business" of their defeat in the previous year's final.

Details

References

External links
RTÉ's full match coverage on RTÉ Player

Final
FAI Women's Cup finals
FAI Women's Cup Final